Birger Jarlsgatan is one of the longest streets in central Stockholm, Sweden.  The street forms the border between Östermalm and the two neighbouring districts Norrmalm and Vasastaden.

It is named after Birger Jarl since 1885, then "Birger Jarls gata" (gata meaning "street"). The contemporary spelling has been used since 1932.

Stureplan and Balettakademien are situated on Birger Jarlsgatan. The street is also home to some of Stockholm's more exclusive shops, including Gucci, Max Mara, Louis Vuitton, Georg Jensen, Mulberry and Cerruti.

See also
Geography of Stockholm

Streets in Stockholm
Shopping districts and streets in Sweden
Balettakademien